Gene Sherman may refer to:

 Gene Sherman (art specialist), (born 1947) South African-born Australian academic
 Gene Sherman (reporter) (1915–1969), journalist for the Los Angeles Times
 Gene Sherman (sportscaster), pioneer radio and television sportscaster in Iowa